Aggy may be a diminutive form of the given names Agnetha, Agamemnon, Agata, Agatha, Agnes or Aigerim. It may also be a diminutive form of a family name that begins with 'Ag-'. See also Aggie.

Aggy may refer to:

People
 Aggy, a character from 19th century historical novel The Pioneers
 Aggy Dee, a tattoo artist (London, UK)
 Aggy, a character from 2005 children's movie Nanny McPhee
 Aggy Hobbs, 'privileged slave' and mistress of Armistead Burwell; mother of Elizabeth Keckly, White House seamstress
 Aggy Read, Australian croquet champion and film director associated with Ubu Films
 Agyness Deyn, English model
 Gabriel Agbonlahor, a footballer for Aston Villa and England

Places
 Aggy Ridge, formally known as Aonach Eagach, a ridge in the Scottish highlands
 Ogof Agen Allwedd, a Welsh cave system

Other uses
Aggy, slang for "aggressive" or "agitated"
The Aggy, a hairstyle designed by Sam McKnight for model Agyness Deyn
Yandina Airport (ICAO code AGGY)

See also
 Agey, a commune in Côte-d'Or, Bourgogne, France
 AGG (disambiguation)
 Agge (disambiguation)
 Saint Aggei, Wycliffe's spelling of Mar Aggai, the second Bishop of Edessa, Mesopotamia
 Aggey (disambiguation)
 Aggi (disambiguation)
 Aggie (disambiguation)
 Agi (disambiguation)
 Agii (disambiguation)
 Agy, a commune in the Basse-Normandie région of France